Capnoptycha is a genus of moths belonging to the subfamily Tortricinae of the family Tortricidae.

Species
Capnoptycha cavifrons (Turner, 1926)
Capnoptycha ipnitis (Meyrick, 1910)
Capnoptycha tholera (Turner, 1925)
Capnoptycha zostrophora (Turner, 1925)

See also
List of Tortricidae genera

References

External links
tortricidae.com

Epitymbiini
Tortricidae genera